Cummins is a manufacturer of diesel and natural gas engines.

Cummins may also refer to:

Places
 Cummins, South Australia, a town on the Eyre Peninsula in South Australia
 Cummins Creek Wilderness, on the Oregon coast, US
 Cummins House (disambiguation):
 Cummins House, Adelaide, South Australia
 John R. Cummins Farmhouse, Eden Prairie, Minnesota, US
 David Cummins Octagon House, Conneaut, Ohio, US
 Cummins Memorial Theological Seminary, Summerville, South Carolina, US
 Cummins Unit, in Arkansas, US, formerly Cummins prison farm

People
 Cummins (surname)
 Cummins Jackson (1802–1849), Virginia miller who raised his nephew, General Stonewall Jackson

Other uses
 Cummins UK, the Cummins US distributor for the UK and Ireland
 Clan Cumming

See also 
 
 
 Cummings (disambiguation)
 Cummin